Fishing Cone, also known as Fishing Pot Hot Springs is a geyser in the West Thumb Geyser Basin of Yellowstone National Park in the United States.

In the earlier part of the 20th century, this cone had eruptions as high as 40 feet (12 m). As the water level in Yellowstone Lake has increased, the cone is now inundated during the spring and the temperatures in the cone have cooled enough that it no longer erupts and is now considered a hot spring.

History
The name Fishing Cone can be traced back to tales told by mountain men of a lake where one could catch a fish, immediately dunk it into the hot spring, and cook it on the hook. A member of the 1870 Washburn-Langford-Doane Expedition popularized this feat.

William Trumbell, a member of the Washburn party, wrote about the fishing cone in his account of the expedition:

In Henry Winser's The Yellowstone National Park - A Manual for Tourists (1883) he described using hot springs to cook trout:

A ban on boiling live fish in the spring was announced in November 1911 and became effective in the beginning of 1912 following animal welfare concerns. Park visitors are now prohibited from fishing off the cone and cooking the fish in the boiling water altogether.

See also
List of hot springs in the United States
List of hot springs in the world

References

External links
 
 

Geysers of Wyoming
Geothermal features of Teton County, Wyoming
Geothermal features of Yellowstone National Park
Geysers of Teton County, Wyoming